The Coaticook River is a north-flowing river rising in Vermont, United States, and located primarily in the Estrie region of Quebec, Canada. The mouth of the river is located north of Waterville and south of Lennoxville, near the southern border of the city of Sherbrooke, at the Massawippi River. Via the Massawippi and the Saint-François River, it is part of the St. Lawrence River watershed.

Name
The name for the Coaticook River comes from the Abenaki name koatikeku which means "River of the land of the white pine". White pines were common in the surrounding region and the nearby upper Connecticut River valley. Names such as Coös, as in Coös County, New Hampshire, are derivative from this type of tree.

The toponym "Coaticook River" was officialized on December 5, 1968, at the Commission de toponymie du Québec.

Geography
The source of the Coaticook River is Norton Pond (length , altitude ), in Essex County, Vermont, south of the Canada–US border. The valley holding this lake continues south across a low height of land, draining via the Pherrins River into the Clyde River at Island Pond, Vermont.

The Coaticook River flows northward  on American territory, crossing a forested and agricultural valley. A railway and Vermont Route 114 follow the river on the east side.

After crossing the international border, the river enters the municipality of Coaticook and flows generally north through:
 the hamlet of Stanhope (part of Coaticook);
 the village of Dixville;
 the city of Coaticook, where the river has dug a  passage through rock formed thousands of years ago;
 the west side of the village of Compton;
 the village of Waterville.

References

See also 

 Coaticook Regional County Municipality
 List of rivers of Quebec
 List of rivers of Vermont

Rivers of Estrie
Rivers of Vermont
Coaticook Regional County Municipality